Corrientes, Street of Dreams is a 1949 Argentine musical film directed by Román Viñoly Barreto and starring Mariano Mores and Yeya Duciel.

Plot 
A story about a humble musician who triumphs by overcoming his failures and a young woman who arrives in Buenos Aires from the interior of the country in search of triumph but meets death.

Cast
Mariano Mores
Yeya Duciel
Judith Sulián
Lydia Quintana
Maruja Roig
Amalia Bernabé
Diana Ingro
Carlos Lagrotta
Diego Marcote
Carlos Belluci
Chas de Cruz
Fernando Lamas

References

External links
 

1949 films
1940s Spanish-language films
Argentine black-and-white films
Films directed by Román Viñoly Barreto
1949 musical films
Argentine musical films
Films set in Buenos Aires
1940s Argentine films